TCC may refer to:

Companies
Taiwan Cement Corporation
The Casual Courier
The Clearing Corporation
Trammell Crow Company
Travancore Cochin Chemicals, Kochi, Kerala, India
The Coring Company, Mo i Rana, Norway

Organizations 
Tanana Chiefs Conference
Theory of Cryptography Conference
Technology and Construction Court
Texas Cave Conservancy
Texas Cryptologic Center
Toronto Congress Centre
Travelers' Century Club
Tri-County Conference (disambiguation)
True Catholic Church
Tucson Convention Center
Tunisian Community Center
Tysons Corner Center
The Carter Center

Colleges and education 
Tacoma Community College
Tallahassee Community College
Tarrant County College
Taught Course Centre
Texas Chiropractic College
Tidewater Community College
Torpoint Community College
Traverse City Central High School
Trinity Catholic College, Lismore
Trinity Christian College
Trinity College, Cambridge
Tulsa Community College

Science, technology, and medicine 
Terminal complement complex, the membrane attack complex of the complement system
Thermomechanical Cuttings Cleaner
Total contact casting, a specially designed cast designed to take weight of the foot
Torque converter clutch
Transitional cell carcinoma, which affects the bladder
Triclocarban, a disinfectant
 TCC, a codon for the amino acid serine

Computers 
 Take Command Console, a command line interpreter by JP Software
 Tiny C Compiler, a C compiler
 Time Coordinated Computing, a technology from Intel

Music and entertainment 
The Catholic Channel
The Children's Channel
The Classic Crime
The Cowboy Channel
The Closing Chronicles
The Comedy Channel
Toronto Children's Chorus
Turtle Creek Chorale
Harry Potter and the Cursed Child
Ten Crack Commandments

Other uses 
Tax Court of Canada
Transnational capitalist class
Tucumcari Municipal Airport (IATA airport code)